Henri-Auguste d'Halluin (February 6, 1897 – January 22, 1985), known by the pseudonym Henry Dorgères, was a French political activist. He is best known for his Comités de Défense Paysanne.

Henri Dorgères was born in 1897, in Wasquehal, a small town in north of France. In 1927, he moved to Rennes, in Brittany, and it was there that he founded his first Peasants' Defense Committee. The members of these Defense Committees were also known as "Green shirts" in the style of Italian fascist leader Benito Mussolini's Black shirts.

Dorgères was awarded the Ordre de la Francisque by Marshal Philippe Pétain for his work in the French right-wing. Because of his fascist sympathies, Dorgères was imprisoned by the Allies during the liberation of France in 1944. He was released because of work he had done with the Resistance during the war. In 1956, he was elected to the French National Assembly from the Breton town of Ille-et-Vilaine; he remained in the Assembly until 1958.

Sources

1897 births
1985 deaths
French politicians
French tax resisters